Bocconi University is a private university in Milan, Italy. Bocconi provides education in the fields of economics, finance, law, management, political science, public administration and computer science. SDA Bocconi, the university's business school, offers MBA and Executive MBA programs.

Bocconi University is consistently ranked as the best university in Italy in its fields, and as one of the best in the world. In 2022, QS World University Rankings ranked the university 6th worldwide and 2nd in Europe in business and management studies, as well as 1st in economics and econometrics outside the U.S. and the U.K. (16th worldwide).

History

Bocconi University was founded in 1902 by Ferdinando Bocconi and was named after his son, who died in the Battle of Adwa during the First Italo-Ethiopian War. The university was originally affiliated with the Polytechnic University of Milan engineering school and incorporated a teaching model that was based on what was in use at the École Supérieure of Antwerp.

Campus

The campus was originally located in Via Statuto near the Pinacoteca di Brera, where its first building was inaugurated in 1902. The campus is now located beside Parco Ravizza, between Via Sarfatti and Viale Bligny and consists of several buildings within walking distance to Porta Ticinese, the Basilica of Sant'Eustorgio:
The Sarfatti Building is the oldest building on campus. It was designed in 1936 by the Italian architect Giuseppe Pagano. It contains classrooms, an aula magna, a restaurant, and most of the administrative offices. Its entrance features two lion statues which are the subject of several university myths.
The pensionato building, which faces Via Ferdinando Bocconi, was inaugurated in 1956 by architect Giovanni Muzio and hosts some grand halls, some of the canteen and dormitory facilities (350 bedrooms on 5 floors), and some faculty offices. The different floors have an irregular form and bear the shape of a symmetric "L" letter, which stands for Laude.
The SDA Bocconi building, which is also in Via Ferdinando Bocconi, was opened in 1985 and featured two blocks with a distinct set of dark metal panels. The building was extended in 2001, especially to host EGEA, the university bookstore. The campus football pitch is placed between the pensionato and the SDA Bocconi building.
The modern Velodromo building was projected by Ignazio Gardella and opened in 2001. It is called so due to its form resembling an ellipsoid velodrome. Each of its four floors has about ten classrooms with a capacity of 150. The Velodromo uses a geothermal exchange heat pump as its air conditioning system, which provides energy conservation. A marble statue of Ferdinando Bocconi overlooks the foyer of the ground floor.
Close by, in Piazza Sraffa, are the Library building (also built by Giovanni Muzio in 1962), the campus chapel "San Ferdinando", and some smaller buildings such as those with the offices of the Language Center and other extracurricular activities.
In 2007, a new building was inaugurated in Via Guglielmo Roentgen known as Grafton Building from the name of the Irish practice Grafton Architects which designed the innovative building. The Grafton Building won the "World building of the year" at the World Architecture Festival 2008 held in Barcelona. The new building houses the offices of the entire Faculty, with its Departments and Research Centers in Viale Bligny. Its underground levels include, in addition to the new Aula Magna, seminar rooms, a spacious foyer, an exhibition area and parking. It is situated next to the Velodromo. The 2020 Pritzker Architecture Prize was awarded to its designers, Yvonne Farrell and Shelley McNamara of Grafton Architects.

Several other administrative and research offices of Bocconi's institutes are scattered across the area, especially around Parco Ravizza and Viale Isonzo.

Dormitories
Bocconi University provides off-campus students with approximately 1800 places in dorms. Residences for students are Bocconi Residence, Javotte Residence, Dubini Residence, Spadolini Residence, Arcobaleno Residence, the more modern Isonzo Residence, Bligny Residence, and the latest Castiglioni Residence (inaugurated in 2018) and the former Kramer Residence (Now closed).

Academics

Undergraduate programs
The university offers four three-year undergraduate courses in Economics which share a common basis in the first three semesters and then distinguish themselves from one another by focusing on either Finance (CLEF), Social sciences (CLES) or Business administration (CLEAM); the fourth course is entirely taught in English (BIEF) and is targeted at both international students and students pursuing an international career. Students in this course have the choice to major in Economics, Management or Finance during their course of studies.

A fifth separate three-year undergraduate course in Economics focuses on the economics and management of Arts, Culture and Communication (CLEACC).

Another three-year undergraduate course is the Bachelor's in International Politics and Government (BIG), the first degree in the field of political science and international relations offered by the university. 
 
The university also offers a five-year course in Law, which incorporates the Italian equivalents of the Bachelor of Laws and the Master of Laws.

Both the bachelor's degrees in Finance in Italian (CLEF) and in English (BIEF) have been recognized by the Chartered Financial Analyst Institute (CFA Institute). The partnership is granted to programs which cover at least 70% of the content necessary to take the CFA Program Exam level III, the highest level.

In a joint venture with the Central European University of Budapest, Bocconi also offers a four-year Dual Degree in International Business, the first two years of which are spent in Budapest and the latter in Milan.

Graduate programs
The Bocconi Graduate School mainly offers master programs mainly taught in English, with some also in Italian:
International Management; 
CEMS MIM Program
China MIM Program
Management (English and Italian); 
ESSEC - Bocconi Double Degree
Marketing Management (English and Italian); 
Accounting, Financial Management and Control (English and Italian);
Finance (English and Italian); 
Economics and Management in Arts, Culture, Media and Entertainment; 
Economics and Management for Arts, Culture and Communication;
Economics and Management of Government and International Organizations
Economics and Social Sciences;
Economics and Management of Innovation and Technology; 
Data Science and Business Analytics;
Cyber Risk Strategy and Governance
LSE - Bocconi Double Degree;
Sciences Po - Bocconi Double Degree;
Law and Business Administration (Only in Italian).
Bocconi has established many partnerships for its Master of Science programs: the Master of Science in Finance was among the first six programs in the world to establish a partnership with the CFA institute and the first in continental Europe, while the Masters of Science in Management and International Management enable a select number of students to take part in the CEMS Master of International Management, of which Bocconi is a founding member, along with HEC, ESADE and University of Cologne.

School of Law

Bocconi University School of Law was established in 2006, consolidating the tradition of legal studies at Bocconi under the aegis of the "A. Sraffa" Institute for Comparative Law. The School of Law currently offers a combined LL.B. and LL.M. in Law, runs the Specialization School for Legal professions in cooperation with the University of Pavia, and hosts a Summer Academy in cooperation with the University of Trento, as well as with the Sant'Anna School of Advanced Studies.

PhD School
The Bocconi PhD School offers the following 4-year PhD programmes:
PhD in Economics and Finance;
PhD in Business Administration and Management;
PhD in Statistics and Computer Science;
PhD in Public Policy and Administration;
PhD in Legal Studies (3-year program);

SDA Bocconi

SDA Bocconi is the graduate business school of the university and offers MBA Programs. The school is also the publisher of E&M (Economia & Management), an Italian business and management review. The SDA also offers further Master of Science programs in Corporate Finance and Banking, Real Estate Management, Fine Food and Beverage management, Fashion Management, Design Management, Sports Law and Sport Management, and a Master in Stage and Show Management. The SDA also offers a Doctorate in Business Administration (DBA) and professional education.

Research and endowment
In 2006, research was mainly funded by Bocconi itself (around €1.5 million), the European Union (around €1.4 million) and the Italian Ministry of Education, Universities and Research (around €300 thousand), in addition to other external sources (around €11 million). In 2011, the European Research Council (ERC) assigned around €5 million to five projects in the area "social science and humanities" led by five Bocconi professors.

As of 2007, the university had 20 permanent research centres and four research project centres. Bocconi is a member of the Offshoring Research Network, an international network researching the offshoring of business processes and services.

Departments
Accounting
Economics
Finance
Management and Technology
Marketing
Decision Sciences
Legal Studies
Policy Analysis and Public Management
Computing sciences

Permanent Research Centers
ASK - Centre for Research on Management and Economics of Arts and Culture Institutions (Study centre on the economics and management of the arts and culture)
PAOLO BAFFI CENTRE - Paolo Baffi Centre on International Markets, Money and Regulation
CAREFIN - Centre for Applied Research in Finance
CERGAS - Centre for Research on Health and Social Care Management (Institutional structures; management of public and private companies providing healthcare and social services)
CERMES - Centre for Research on Marketing & Services (Marketing and competitive analysis; commercial consumption and distribution; trade fairs)
CERTeT - Center for Research on Regional Economics, Transport and Tourism (Urban, regional and transport structures of territorial economics; evaluation of EU policies on territorial development)
CREDI - "Ariberto Mignoli" Centre for European Research on Business Law and History
CReSV - Center for Research on Sustainability and Value
CRIOS - Center for Research on Innovation, Organization and Strategy
DONDENA CENTRE - Carlo F. Dondena Centre for Research on Social Dynamics (Interdisciplinary research on social cohesion, demography, life course dynamics and public policy)
IEFE - Centre for Research on Energy and Environmental Economics and Policy (Energy economics and policies; environmental policies and management; economics and management of public utility companies - energy and environmental)
IGIER - Innocenzo Gasparini Institute for Economic Research. Part of the Institute of Economics, it operates jointly with two international bodies, the US-based NBER, National Bureau of Economic Research, and the UK-based CEPR, Centre for Economic Policy Research (Economics and economic policy)
ECONPUBBLICA - Centre for Research on the Public Sector (Taxation system; organisation of the social state; privatisation; income distribution; fiscal federalism)

International rankings

Student life

Student publications
The university hosts student-run publications:
Tra i Leoni: a campus magazine run by the eponymous society.
Bocconi School of Law Student-Edited Papers: the Law School's official student publication. The journal's editorial board are selected by way of an annual write-on competition, and go on to select and provide feedback on submitted papers, as well as organising the annual call for papers.
IS@B News: a campus magazine run by the International Student Association (IS@B).
Be OBjective Magazine: a bimonthly pdf magazine founded by students from the ACME course. The magazine focuses on art, culture, media and entertainment.

Recreational activities
Bocconi lies in the Navigli area of Milan.

Superstitions
In the atrium of the oldest building of the university, there are three sets of doors. The central doors, which are larger than the others, have two lions on either side of them. There is a superstition within the university that students who pass in between the two lions via the central doors risk not being able to graduate. This derives from the adage "Chi passa tra i Leoni non si laurea alla Bocconi."

If seen from the top, the three main buildings of Bocconi seem to spell "30L" (30 cum laude), the maximum achievable grade in any exam. The building in Via Roentgen is the "3", the velodrome is the "0" and the main building is a cross of two "L"s.

Notable people

Alumni

Alberto Alemanno, professor of law at New York University (NYU)
Alberto Alesina, Harvard University professor
Franco Amatori, Bocconi University professor of Economics History, past president of the European Business History Association
Jörg Asmussen, member of the executive board of the European Central Bank
Oriana Bandiera, professor of economics at the London School of Economics
Tito Boeri, professor of Labour Economics at Bocconi University, columnist for La Repubblica and former president of INPS (National Social Security Institute in Italy)
Francesca Cornelli, Dean of Northwestern University's Kellogg School of Management, previously professor of finance and deputy dean at London Business School
Jelena Djokovic, tennis player Novak Djokovic's wife
Luigi Einaudi, President of the Italian Republic (1948–1955) and governor of Bank of Italy
Francesco Giavazzi, economist and Bocconi University professor
Vittorio Grilli, Italian Minister of Economy and Finance (2012–13) and previously a professor at Yale University
Fiorella Kostoris, professor of economics at the University of Rome (La Sapienza)
Luca de Meo, CEO of Renault; former president of SEAT
Antonio Merlo, Rice University professor and dean
Mario Monti, former Italian Prime Minister (2011-13)
Emma Bonino, former Italian Minister of Foreign Affairs (2013-14)
Vittorio Colao, CEO of Vodafone Group,  Italian Minister for Technological Innovation in the government of Prime Minister Mario Draghi
Tommaso Padoa-Schioppa, economist and former Italian Minister of Economy (2006-08)
Corrado Passera, former Italian Minister of Economic Development, Infrastructure and Transport (2011-13)
Barbara Pollastrini, former Italian Minister of for Equal Opportunity in the Prodi II Cabinet (2006)
Nouriel Roubini, NYU Stern School of Business professor
Fabrizio Saccomanni, Minister of Economy and Finance of the Italian government and former General Manager of the Bank of Italy
Paolo Scaroni, CEO of Eni; chair of A.C. Milan
Renato Soru, billionaire entrepreneur and manager, founder of the internet service company Tiscali
Luigi Zingales, University of Chicago Booth School of Business professor
Patrizia Toia, Italian politician and member of the European Parliament
Marco Patuano, CEO of Telecom Italia
Federico Marchetti, CEO and founder of YOOX Group
Marco Cappato, Italian politician and member of the European Parliament
Alessandro Magnoli Bocchi, economist
Alessandro Pansa, former CEO of Finmeccanica
Claudio Costamagna, chairman of Advanced Accelerator Applications
Giovanni Arrighi, professor of sociology at Johns Hopkins University
Domenico Lombardi, president of The Oxford Institute for Economic Policy, and a Senior Fellow at the Brookings Institution
Eduardo Missoni, secretary general of the World Organization of the Scout Movement
Andrea Enria, chair of the ECB Supervisory Board (2019–present), and previously chair of the European Banking Authority (2011–19)
Mario Biondi, novelist, travel writer, poet
Paolo Brera, journalist, author, and former assistant professor of political economy at Bocconi University
Teresa de Lauretis, writer and professor at the University of California, Santa Cruz
Valerio Massimo Manfredi, journalist, television host, historical novelist
Mario Arcelli, economist, Minister for the Budget in the Italian government
Fabio De'Longhi, CEO of De'Longhi
Francesco Milleri, CEO of Luxottica
Salvatore Aranzulla, blogger and entrepreneur
Dubravka Negre, Minister of Mining and Energy of Serbia since 2022
Sergio Noja Noseda, professor of Islamic law, Arabic Language and Literature. Author of multiple books on Islamic culture
Alessandro Profumo, banker
Marco Tronchetti Provera, manager
Massimo Renon, CEO of the Benetton Group since 2020
Luigi Roth, CEO of Breda Railway Construction (1993-2001)
Leopoldo Sabbatini, first dean of Bocconi University, vice president of the Milan Chamber of Commerce
Guido Tabellini, former rector of Bocconi University (2008–12) and columnist for Il Sole 24 Ore
Sara Tommasi, actress
Benedetto Della Vedova, politician
Roberto Vedovotto, CEO of Kering Eyewear since 2014

Other

Andrea Agnelli, businessman and chairman of Juventus F.C.
Prince Aimone of Savoy, Duke of Apulia
Pierre Casiraghi, seventh in line to the throne of Monaco, son of Caroline, Princess of Hanover, and nephew of Albert II, Prince of Monaco
Sara Tommasi, model 
Giovanni Cobolli Gigli, former chairman of Juventus F.C.
Chiara Ferragni, fashion blogger, has not obtained the degree.
Steven Goldstein, race car driver
Nina Senicar, Serbian model
Carolina Gillespie, professional ice skater for Italy
Beatrice Borromeo, noblewoman of the House of Borromeo, journalist and ex-model
Prince Joachim of Belgium, Archduke of Austria-Este
Vittorio Gallinari, basketball player
Clarence Seedorf, Dutch football player
Carla Sozzani, gallerist known for creating the 10 Corso Como complex
Ratan Tata, Indian businessman and founder of TATA motors

Alumnus of the Year
The award for Alumnus of the Year was given for the first time in 2011 to Fabrizio Saccomanni, former general director of Bank of Italy, replacing the awards for Bocconian of the Year (given since 1988) and Master of Masters (given since 2007). The award is given to a Bocconi alumnus from any of the five schools (Undergraduate School, School of Law, Graduate School, PhD School and SDA Bocconi School of Management) who has distinguished himself following the Bocconian values of professionality, entrepreneurship, integrity, responsibility and openness. The award is given by the Bocconi Alumni Association (BAA) and recipients have included:  Jörg Asmussen, Emma Bonino, Urbano Cairo, Giovanni Castellucci, Vittorio Colao, Claudio Costamagna, Andrea Enria, Corrado Passera, Alessandro Profumo, Nouriel Roubini, Paolo Scaroni, Carlo Scognamiglio, Renato Soru, Lucio Stanca, Luca de Meo, Francesca Bellettini, Roberto Mazzotta, Stefano Sassi, Giuseppe Sala, Federico Marchetti, Giovanni Ciserani, Diego Piacentini, Laura Cioli, Alberto Cribiore, Gaetano Micciché, Paolo Cuccia, Enrico Cucchiani, Vittorio Grilli, Marco Drago, Emma Marcegaglia, Isabella Ventura, Marco Tronchetti Provera, Giovanni Giudici, Jody Vender, Tommaso Padoa-Schioppa, Giordano Zucchi.

See also 
 University of Milan
 Polytechnic University of Milan

References

External links

 
Business schools in Italy
Educational institutions established in 1902
Economics schools
1902 establishments in Italy

sc:Universidade "Bocconi" de Milano